The 1971–72 Cypriot Third Division was the second season of the Cypriot third-level football league. Ethnikos Asteras Limassol won their 1st title.

Format
Eleven teams participated in the 1971–72 Cypriot Third Division. All teams played against each other twice, once at their home and once away. The team with the most points at the end of the season crowned champions. The first four teams were promoted to 1972–73 Cypriot Second Division.

Point system
Teams received two points for a win, one point for a draw and zero points for a loss.

League standings

Sources

See also
 Cypriot Third Division
 1971–72 Cypriot First Division
 1971–72 Cypriot Cup

Cypriot Third Division seasons
Cyprus
1971–72 in Cypriot football